Erythrobacteraceae is a bacterium family in the order of Sphingomonadales.

Phylogeny
The currently accepted taxonomy is based on the List of Prokaryotic names with Standing in Nomenclature and the phylogeny is based on whole-genome sequences.

References

Further reading 
 
 

Sphingomonadales